Good One is the debut live album by comedian Tig Notaro released by Secretly Canadian in 2011 on CD, download and vinyl.  It is the first comedy album released by the record label.  The CD comes with a DVD titled Have Tig at Your Party which was produced in 2008 by Tig's production company ZeroDollarsAndZeroSenseProductions.  Notaro toured with fellow Secretly Canadian artist Jens Lekman before recording the album.  The album was recorded on Tig's 40th birthday.  Fellow comedian and friend, Sarah Silverman, can be heard introducing Tig at the beginning of the show.  The back cover photo is of Tig's actual filing cabinet which was given to her by director Sam Raimi when she was his assistant years ago.

Track listing
Disc 1: CD - Good One

Disc 2: DVD - Have Tig at Your Party!

Credits
 Recorded, Mixed and Mastered - Mike Bridavsky at Russian Recording
 Front Cover Photo - Cassie Wright
 Back Cover and Liner Notes Photos - Stef Willen
 Liner Notes Photo - T. Ballard Lesemann
 Album Dedication - Sheila Leblanc
 Special Thanks - Mark Flanagan, David Huntsberger, Nick Kroll, Martha Kelly, Heather Lawless, Dave Hill, Michael McDonald, Grant Curtis, Katie Wright, Scott Aukerman, Chris Young, Jimmy Dore, Clea DuVall, Kate Micucci, Cheryl Hines, Jens Lekman, Kyle Dunnigan
 Note: There are many more Thank You credits, but these are just the main notable people.

Charts
The album reached No. 4 on the Billboard Top Comedy Albums chart.

References

Further reading

Tig Notaro albums
Live comedy albums
Live albums by American artists
2010s comedy albums
Stand-up comedy albums
2010s spoken word albums
Spoken word albums by American artists
2011 live albums
2011 debut albums
Secretly Canadian live albums